Colorado is home to 101  fishes, 55 of which are native. Twenty-three native species are threatened or endangered at either the federal or state level. The federally endangered species are the Humpback Chub (Gila cypha), Bonytail (Gila elegans), Colorado Pikeminnow (Ptychocheilus lucius), and Razorback Sucker (Xyrauchen texanus).

References 

 Johnson, B., Nomanbhoy, N. (2005). An eField Guide to Western Fishes-Colorado and Wyoming

Retrieved from

https://taurus.cnr.colostate.edu/projects/cofishguide/index.cfm

Fuller, P. (2017). NAS-Nonindigenous Aquatic Species. USGS.

Retrieved from

https://nas.er.usgs.gov/about/default.aspx

"The IUCN Red List of Threatened Species." IUCN Red List of Threatened Species,

Retrieved from

https://www.iucnredlist.org/

Page, Lawrence M., and Brooks M. Burr. A Field Guide to Freshwater Fishes: North America, North of Mexico. Houghton Mifflin Company, 2010.

Colorado
Lists of fauna of Colorado